The 2018–19 Euroleague Basketball Next Generation Tournament, also called Adidas Next Generation Tournament by sponsorship reasons, is the 17th edition of the international junior basketball tournament organized by the Euroleague Basketball Company.

As in past years, 32 teams joined the first stage, which are played in four qualifying tournaments between December 2018 and February 2019.

Qualifying tournaments

Valencia

The Valencia Tournament was played between 28 and 30 December 2018.

Group A

Group B

Day 1

Day 2

Day 3

Classification games

Final

Munich Tournament

The Munich Tournament was played between 25 and 27 January 2019.

Group A

Group B

Day 1

Day 2

Day 3

Classification games

Final

Kaunas Tournament

The Kaunas Tournament was played between 8 and 10 February 2019.

Group A

Group B

Day 1

Day 2

Day 3

Classification games

Final

Belgrade Tournament

The Belgrade Tournament was played between 22 and 24 February 2019.

Group A

Group B

Day 1

Day 2

Day 3

Classification games

Final

Final Tournament

The Final Tournament was played between 16 and 19 May 2019 in Vitoria-Gasteiz, Spain.

Teams

Group A

Group B

Day 1

Day 2

Day 3

Final

Awards

MVP
 Mario Nakić (Real Madrid)

Rising star
 Paulius Murauskas (Žalgiris Kaunas)

All-Tournament Team

 Mario Nakić (Real Madrid)
 Usman Garuba (Real Madrid)
 Deni Avdija (Maccabi Teddy Tel Aviv)
 Aleksandar Langović (Mega Bemax)
 Matej Rudan (Bayern Munich)

References

External links
Official website

Euroleague Basketball Next Generation Tournament
Next Generation Tournament